Shalom aleichem  is a spoken greeting in Hebrew, meaning "peace be upon you". The plural form "" is used even when addressing one person.

This form of greeting is traditional among Jews throughout the world. The greeting is more common among Ashkenazi Jews.

History 

 (šālōm upon you, m. singular) is first attested in the Scroll of Blessings for the First Month (before 30 BCE), a Dead Sea Scroll, where it is spelled, in their manner, with a final He. 

The plural  first appears in the Jerusalem Talmud (c. 400 CE), always with a plural object. It occurs there six times and the response is to repeat . 

 appears many times in the Talmud Bavli (c. 500 CE), where the response is to repeat . 

The inverted response  (upon you šālōm, m. singular) is first attested in the Midrash Abba Gorion (before 1050 CE), in its gloss on Esther 3:5: 
"What did Haman do when he passed by and Mordechai did not rise to greet him? He came from one side and made as if Mordechai had greeted him, saying 'ʿālēkā šālōm,' but Mordechai replied, 'the LORD says there is no šālōm for the wicked.'"

The plural greeting and response became common among European Jews in the second half of the next millennium, as the use of plural forms to denote respect was imported from French and German.

Other religions 

Many religions share cognates to this greeting.

The related Arabic variation  ("peace be upon you",  in Arabic), is used by Muslims of many language and ethnic backgrounds. The appropriate response is Wa alaikumus-salaam ("and unto you peace"). As-salāmu alaykum and its variants are also used by Arabs of different religions as a greeting. Aramaic and Classical Syriac use , which means "peace on you".

Within the Catholic and Orthodox Churches, Peace be with you (in Greek: ,) is the initial liturgical greeting by a bishop or priest during divine services. In Mass, Catholic priests who are not bishops say "The Lord be with you." The response is "And with your spirit." A somewhat similar greeting used within the Mass by bishops and priests is "The peace of the Lord be with you always." In Orthodox Church, the greeting is always the same: Peace be with you.

Similarly, "Peace be with you" is used within Anglican liturgies of the Episcopal Church and other Anglican churches, with the response being "And also with you." The same is true of Lutheran churches, some Presbyterian and Reformed churches, such as the Presbyterian Church and the Church of the Brethren.

See also 
 Shalom
 As-salamu alaykum
 Salaam

References 

Greeting words and phrases
Hebrew words and phrases
Judaism and peace